Ice Warriors is a British game show which aired on ITV from 24 January to 21 March 1998 and was hosted by Dani Behr. It had a similar format to Gladiators, except that the games were played on an ice rink rather than in an arena. During its airing on ITV, it was sponsored by 7 Up.

Although the series won a Bronze Rose for Light Entertainment at the 1998 Rose d'Or Festival, it was not successful with critics and viewers, receiving bad reviews and poor ratings. The show came to an end after one series.

References

External links

1998 British television series debuts
1998 British television series endings
1990s British game shows
ITV game shows
London Weekend Television shows
Television series by ITV Studios
Obstacle racing television game shows